The 1961–62 NBA season was the Lakers' 14th season in the NBA and second season in Los Angeles. For the first time since 1959, the Lakers advanced to the NBA Finals, and it was the first NBA Finals appearance for the team in the city of Los Angeles. For the second time, they met the Boston Celtics, who they would meet five further times in the 1960s. However, the Lakers lost in seven games in a heartbreaker; Frank Selvy missed a potential winning shot in Game 7 after the Lakers had lost Game 6 in Los Angeles, and the Celtics pulled away in overtime to win their fourth straight title.

Roster

Regular season

Season standings

x – clinched playoff spot

Record vs. opponents

Game log

Playoffs

|- align="center" bgcolor="#ccffcc"
| 1
| March 24
| Detroit
| W 132–108
| Elgin Baylor (35)
| Elgin Baylor (17)
| Los Angeles Memorial Sports Arena
| 1–0
|- align="center" bgcolor="#ccffcc"
| 2
| March 25
| Detroit
| W 127–112
| Jerry West (40)
| West, Baylor (13)
| Los Angeles Memorial Sports Arena
| 2–0
|- align="center" bgcolor="#ccffcc"
| 3
| March 27
| @ Detroit
| W 111–106
| Elgin Baylor (34)
| Elgin Baylor (17)
| Cobo Arena
| 3–0
|- align="center" bgcolor="#ffcccc"
| 4
| March 29
| @ Detroit
| L 117–118
| Elgin Baylor (45)
| Elgin Baylor (17)
| Cobo Arena
| 3–1
|- align="center" bgcolor="#ffcccc"
| 5
| March 31
| Detroit
| L 125–132
| Elgin Baylor (37)
| Elgin Baylor (19)
| Los Angeles Memorial Sports Arena
| 3–2
|- align="center" bgcolor="#ccffcc"
| 6
| April 3
| @ Detroit
| W 123–117
| West, Baylor (38)
| —
| Cobo Arena
| 4–2
|-

|- align="center" bgcolor="#ffcccc"
| 1
| April 7
| @ Boston
| L 108–122
| Elgin Baylor (35)
| Elgin Baylor (17)
| Jerry West (4)
| Boston Garden7,467
| 0–1
|- align="center" bgcolor="#ccffcc"
| 2
| April 8
| @ Boston
| W 129–122
| Jerry West (40)
| Jim Krebs (13)
| Frank Selvy (6)
| Boston Garden12,364
| 1–1
|- align="center" bgcolor="#ccffcc"
| 3
| April 10
| Boston
| W 117–115
| Elgin Baylor (39)
| Elgin Baylor (23)
| Frank Selvy (5)
| Los Angeles Memorial Sports Arena15,180
| 2–1
|- align="center" bgcolor="#ffcccc"
| 4
| April 11
| Boston
| L 103–115
| Elgin Baylor (38)
| Elgin Baylor (14)
| Elgin Baylor (6)
| Los Angeles Memorial Sports Arena15,104
| 2–2
|- align="center" bgcolor="#ccffcc"
| 5
| April 14
| @ Boston
| W 126–121
| Elgin Baylor (61)
| Elgin Baylor (22)
| Frank Selvy (5)
| Boston Garden13,909
| 3–2
|- align="center" bgcolor="#ffcccc"
| 6
| April 16
| Boston
| L 105–119
| West, Baylor (34)
| Elgin Baylor (15)
| West, LaRusso (5)
| Los Angeles Memorial Sports Arena14,030
| 3–3
|- align="center" bgcolor="#ffcccc"
| 7
| April 18
| @ Boston
| L 107–110 (OT)
| Elgin Baylor (41)
| Elgin Baylor (22)
| three players tied (4)
| Boston Garden13,909
| 3–4
|-

Awards and records
 Elgin Baylor, All-NBA First Team
 Jerry West, All-NBA First Team
 Elgin Baylor, NBA All-Star Game
 Jerry West, NBA All-Star Game
 Frank Selvy, NBA All-Star Game
 Rudy LaRusso, NBA All-Star Game

References

Los Angeles Lakers seasons
Los Angeles
Los Angle
Los Angle